Moscow is a ghost town in Licking County, in the U.S. state of Ohio.

History
Moscow was laid out in 1830.

References

Geography of Licking County, Ohio
1830 establishments in Ohio
Populated places established in 1830
Ghost towns in Ohio